Porcataraneus is a genus of Asian orb-weaver spiders first described by X. Q. Mi & X. J. Peng in 2011.  it contains only three species from India and China.

References

Araneidae
Araneomorphae genera
Spiders of China
Spiders of the Indian subcontinent